Aydar Rashidovich Aganin (born 23 August 1967) is a Russian diplomat of Tatar descent, and a former journalist.

Biography
Aganin was born in Kazan, in what was then the Russian Soviet Federative Socialist Republic, in the Soviet Union, on 23 August 1967. He graduated from Moscow State Institute of International Relations in 1990 and joined the Soviet Ministry of Foreign Affairs that year. He served as counselor of the Russian embassy in Jordan between 2003 and 2007, and in 2007 became Deputy Chief Editor of ANO TV-Novosti, and Director of the Arabic Broadcasting of Russia Today's Arabic news service  Rusya Al-Yaum.

Between 2011 and 2016, Aganin was Senior Adviser at the Russian Embassy in the United States of America, and in 2017 until 2019 he served as head of the Russian mission to the Palestinian National Authority in Ramallah. In June 2019 he became Deputy Director of the Foreign Policy Planning Department of the Russian Ministry of Foreign Affairs, and received the diplomatic rank of Envoy Extraordinary and Plenipotentiary second class that month. Aganin is fluent in Russian, English, Arabic and Hebrew. He currently serves as the Russian ambassador to Libya.

Selected publications
Water Resources of the Jordan River Basin and Arab-Israeli Conflict
Tribes and Clans of the Hashemite Kingdom of Jordan
Modern Jordan
Biblical Jordan

References

1967 births
Living people
Russian male journalists
People from Kazan
21st-century Russian diplomats
Moscow State Institute of International Relations alumni
Ambassadors of Russia to Libya
Ambassadors of Russia to the State of Palestine
21st-century Russian journalists